Andrew William Walker (born June 9, 1979) is a Canadian actor and film producer. He made his film debut in Laserhawk (1997), followed by roles in American television series such as Maybe It's Me, Sabrina the Teenage Witch, and Hot Properties. He also co-starred in Steel Toes (2006), which earned him an ACTRA Award for Best Actor in 2008. He subsequently appeared in films such as The Mountie and The Gundown, and had a starring role on the Lifetime cop drama Against the Wall.

Personal life
Andrew William Walker was born in Montreal, Quebec, Canada, the son of Joyce Walker, a librarian, and Bruce Walker, a school administrator. His sister is actress and model Jenimay Walker. He is a graduate of Vanier College, where he played football and was given a full scholarship to play at Boston College. After his commitment to BC, he returned home to spring camp at Vanier and tore his anterior cruciate ligament during a routine drill, thus ending his football career.

He is married to fellow Montrealer Cassandra Troy. Together they have two sons: West, born July 2015, and Wolf, born December 2019. In 2013, the couple, along with a friend, started Clover, a company that bottles fresh, cold-pressed juices, with locations in the Los Angeles area. In 2018, the couple rebranded their juice company, naming it Little West after their love of the west coast and their son, West.

Career
Walker started his acting career in Montreal as a recurring lead on the series Student Bodies in 1996-1997, a series lead on Back to Sherwood and then Radio Active from 1998-2000. A month after he arrived in Hollywood he booked a series lead on the TV show Maybe It's Me, then Sabrina, the Teenage Witch. Following a holding deal at Warner Bros., he worked on Wicked Minds, Adopted, Lies and Deception and then landed a recurring spot on the short-lived ABC sitcom Hot Properties.

In 2006, he played a Neo-Nazi skinhead in the film Steel Toes. His performance won him a 2006 Phillip Borsos award at the Whistler Film Festival and the 2008 ACTRA Award for Best Actor.

Walker appeared in the 2007 Lifetime film Abducted: Fugitive For Love. He went on to guest-star on ER, CSI: Miami, CSI: NY, Without a Trace, Reba, and The Big Bang Theory.

In 2010, he guest-starred in the Fox comedy series Sons of Tucson, the Spaghetti Western film The Gundown, and was associate producer for the film Dug Up. In 2011, Walker appeared in a Canadian western film, The Mountie (filmed in 2009), and produced four documentaries and reality TV series in development, also serving as a series regular on Lifetime's cop drama Against the Wall, which was cancelled in December 2011 after thirteen episodes.

In 2012, he starred in his first Hallmark Channel movie A Bride for Christmas alongside Arielle Kebbel. He starred in his next Hallmark movie, A Dream of Christmas with Nikki DeLoach in 2016. More Hallmark TV movies followed: six more in 2017 (Love Struck Cafe, Dashing Through the Snow, Appetite for Love, Date With Love, Love on Ice, and Bridal Wave.), Love in Design in 2018, and two more in 2020. His first film after COVID-19 was Christmas Tree Lane with Alicia Witt. He also reunited for the third time with real-life friend Nikki DeLoach in Sweet Autumn. As of December 2020, Walker has starred in eighteen films for the Hallmark Channel.

Filmography

Film

Television

References

External links
 

1979 births
20th-century Canadian male actors
21st-century Canadian male actors
Anglophone Quebec people
Film producers from Quebec
Canadian male film actors
Canadian male television actors
Living people
Male actors from Montreal
Vanier College alumni